Marcos Oliveira (born June 21, 1978) is a professional Brazilian jiu-jitsu and mixed martial arts fighter from Brazil. He competes in the heavyweight division of Brazilian Jiu Jitsu.

Brazilian jiu-jitsu and mixed martial arts career
Marcos de Oliveira formally started his jiu-jitsu instruction that year and his official instructors, who handed him his blue and purple belts, were Júlio César, Alexandre Baraúna and Marcos Bello (Universidade de Gama Filho).
At the age of 17, Marcos de Oliveira received his black belt in judo (1995). In 2002, Marcos switched to the American Top Team (ATT) academy in order to compete in mixed martial arts (debut in 2004). He received his brown belt and his black belt (December 2006) from the hands of Ricardo Libório, leader of ATT.

In 2010, Oliveira was invited to compete in the Abu Dhabi Fighting Championship Open Weight Grand Prix. He defeated Johan Romming in the first round and then defeated Neil Wain in the second round to reach the "one million dirhams (US$272,260.72)" final. Oliveira went to Thailand to improve his striking before the final fight. However, he lost to Shamil Abdurakhimov in round three.

Mixed martial arts record

|-
|Loss
|align=center|5–3
|Shamil Abdurakhimov
| TKO (punches)
| ADFC: Round 3
|
|align=center|1
|align=center|1:56
|Abu Dhabi, UAE
|ADFC Heavyweight tournament finals
|-
|Win
|align=center|5–2
|Neil Wain
| Decision (unanimous)
| ADFC: Round 2
|
|align=center|3
|align=center|5:00
|Abu Dhabi, UAE
|Advanced to the finals
|-
|Win
|align=center|4–2
|Johan Romming
| KO (punch)
| ADFC: Round 1
|
|align=center|1
|align=center|0:19
|Abu Dhabi, UAE
|Advanced to second round
|-
|Win
|align=center|3–2
|Kevin Jordan
| Decision (unanimous)
| FFP - Untamed 22
|
|align=center|3
|align=center|5:00
|Plymouth, Massachusetts, United States
|
|-
|Win
|align=center|2–2
|Sean Thompson
| TKO (punches)
| NACC - North American Combat Challenge
|
|align=center|1
|align=center|2:38
|Key West, Florida, United States
|
|-
|Loss
|align=center|1–2
|Josh Haynes
| Submission (guillotine choke)
| XFC - Dome Of Destruction 1
|
|align=center|1
|align=center|3:21
|Tacoma, Washington, United States
|
|-
|Loss
|align=center|1–1
|Warren Kikaba
| Decision (unanimous)
| FCC 16 - Freestyle Combat Challenge 16
|
|align=center|3
|align=center|5:00
|Racine, Wisconsin, United States
|
|-
|Win
|align=center|1–0
|Anthony Barbier
| Submission (D'Arce choke)
| BONO 15 - Battle of New Orleans 15
|
|align=center|1
|align=center|1:29
|Metairie, Louisiana, United States
|
|-

References

External links

Brazilian male mixed martial artists
Heavyweight mixed martial artists
Mixed martial artists utilizing Brazilian jiu-jitsu
Mixed martial artists utilizing capoeira
Mixed martial artists utilizing judo
Brazilian capoeira practitioners
Brazilian practitioners of Brazilian jiu-jitsu
People awarded a black belt in Brazilian jiu-jitsu
Brazilian male judoka
Living people
1978 births
Sportspeople from Rio de Janeiro (city)